Port Orange is a city in Volusia County, Florida. The city's population was estimated at 64,842 in 2019 by the U.S. Census Bureau.

The city is part of the Deltona–Daytona Beach–Ormond Beach metropolitan area; the metropolitan area's population in 2010 was 590,289. Port Orange is a principal city in the Fun Coast region of the state of Florida.

Port Orange was settled by John Milton Hawks, who brought freed blacks to work at his sawmill after the U.S. Civil War. Esther Hawks established an integrated school in the area. The colony struggled soon after its creation and most colonists left. The area that became known as Freemanville is a legacy of the settlers who stayed in the area.

Geography

Port Orange is located at  (29.118970, –81.002906).

Demographics

As of the census of 2010, there were 56,048 people, 24,841 households, and 1,544 families residing in the city. The population density was 2,102.3 per square mile. The racial makeup of the city was 91.3% white, 3.3% African American, 0.3% Native American, 2.2% Asian, 0.02% Pacific Islander, 1.0% from other races, and 1.8% from two or more races. Hispanic or Latino of any race were 4.5% of the population.

The median income for a household in the city was $46,572.

Economy

One of the larger businesses in Port Orange is Thompson Pump and Manufacturing. The city has started courting high-tech companies as well, prompting the simulation training defense contractor, Raydon Corporation, to move its headquarters and all operations there in 2010.

Education 

Public primary and secondary education is handled by Volusia County Schools. Port Orange schools are A-rated by the state, and one of the high schools, Spruce Creek High School, has made the list of one of the top 100 high schools in the nation for several years in a row, as well as offering students the International Baccalaureate program.

Elementary schools

 Horizon Elementary School
 Spruce Creek Elementary School
 Sugar Mill Elementary School
 Cypress Creek Elementary School
 Sweetwater Elementary School
 Port Orange Elementary School
 South Daytona Elementary School

Middle schools

 Creekside Middle School 
 Silver Sands Middle School
 Campbell Middle School
 David C. Hinson Sr. Middle School
 Deland Middle School
 Deltona Middle School
 Galaxy Middle School
 Heritage Middle School
 Holly Hill Middle School
 New Smyrna Beach Middle School
 Ormond Beach Middle School
 River Springs Middle School
 Southwestern Middle School
 T. Dewitt Taylor Middle-High

High schools

 Spruce Creek High School
 Atlantic High School
 Deland High School
 Deltona High School
 Mainland High School
 New Smyrna Beach High School
 Pine Ridge High School
 Seabreeze High School
 University High School
 T. Dewitt Taylor Middle-High

Colleges and universities 

Port Orange is the home of the Florida campus of Palmer College of Chiropractic. The campus in Port Orange was founded in 2002 by James E. Hether, D. C.

Notable people

 Vince Carter, NBA player
 Adam Cianciarulo, professional Motocross racer
 Marci Gonzalez, ABC news reporter WABC-TV New York City
 Danielle Harris, actress
 Ryan Lochte, Olympic gold medalist
 Mark Martin, NASCAR driver
 Mike Skinner, NASCAR driver

Public transportation

Port Orange is served by several bus routes operated by VOTRAN. The #4 & #17 offer Sunday and night service.

References

External links

 City of Port Orange official website

 
Populated places on the Intracoastal Waterway in Florida
Cities in Volusia County, Florida
Populated places established in 1867
Cities in Florida
1867 establishments in Florida